Liam Kelly (born 21 September 1975 in Dublin) is an Irish former footballer who played as a striker.

Career
He began his career at Home Farm  in 1993 making his League of Ireland debut on 19 September. After five years at Whitehall Kelly moved to Shelbourne in 1998.

Kelly moved to St Patrick's Athletic in December 1999.

He signed for Shamrock Rovers in March 2003 and made his debut in the first game of the season. He scored his only goal in his second appearance.

Kelly made 18 total appearances in his two seasons in the Hoops including 1 appearance in the UEFA Intertoto Cup. Before transferring to Longford soon after.

Personal life
His brother Garrett played for Rovers in the mid-1990s.

Later career
Kelly managed the PFAI team that took part in the FIFPro Scandinavian Tournament in Oslo, Norway on Friday 14 January 2011 .

Honours
League of Ireland Cup:
 St Patrick's Athletic F.C. 2000-01
Leinster Senior Cup:
 St Patrick's Athletic F.C. 2000

References

Republic of Ireland association footballers
Shamrock Rovers F.C. players
Home Farm F.C. players
Shelbourne F.C. players
St Patrick's Athletic F.C. players
Longford Town F.C. players
League of Ireland players
Glentoran F.C. players
NIFL Premiership players
Living people
1975 births
Association football forwards